Mohamed Saïd (born 10 December 1934) is a Moroccan long-distance runner. He competed in the men's 5000 metres at the 1960 Summer Olympics.

References

1934 births
Living people
Athletes (track and field) at the 1960 Summer Olympics
Moroccan male long-distance runners
Olympic athletes of Morocco
Place of birth missing (living people)
Mediterranean Games medalists in athletics
Athletes (track and field) at the 1959 Mediterranean Games
Mediterranean Games silver medalists for Morocco